William H. Martin was a photographer and successful real photograph post card (RPPC) manufacturer starting in September 1908. In 1894, Martin took over a studio in Ottawa, Kansas. He used photocomposited trick photography and, in 1908, produced wildly exaggerated postcards for commercial trade. His range of cards were so popular that he went into the postcard business exclusively.

Within a few years, his trick photos made him wealthy. He sold the business in 1912, and founded the National Sign Company.

External links

 Story of Dad Martin, from the American Museum of Photography
 National Sign Consulting and Manufacturer - Kieffer & Co

American photographers
Year of birth missing
Year of death missing
People from Ottawa, Kansas